Lash wa Juwayn (also transliterated Lash o Jawain) is a district in Farah Province, Afghanistan. Its population, which is approximately 30% Pashtun and 70% Tajik (ethnic Persian or Fars-tabar), was estimated at 28,000 in January 2005. The main town, also called Lash wa Juwayn, is situated at 508 m elevation by Daryacheh-ye Sistan lake.

Populated places
 Tojg

References

External links
 Map of Settlements AIMS, May 2002

Districts of Farah Province